Thijs Römer (born 26 July 1978) is a Dutch actor. He appeared in more than twenty films since 2000. He divorced actress Katja Schuurman in February 2015.

On November 17th 2022, the Dutch authorities officially announced Römer will be prosecuted for alleged grooming of underaged girls on the internet.

Selected filmography

Awards
Golden Calf for best actor (2005)
Rembrandt Award for Best Dutch Actor (2013)

References

External links
 

1978 births
Living people
Male actors from Amsterdam
Dutch male film actors